Walter A. Orenstein is the former director of the United States' National Immunization Program, a post he held from May 1993 to January 2004.

Education
Orenstein has a bachelor's degree from the City College of New York. He went on to receive his MD from the Albert Einstein College of Medicine in 1972. He then completed a residency in pediatrics at the University of California, San Francisco, after which he completed a fellowship in infectious diseases at the University of Southern California Medical School. Orenstein then completed another residency, this time in preventive medicine at the Centers for Disease Control and Prevention.

Career
Orenstein began working for the CDC's Immunization Program in 1982. He has also served as a consultant to the World Health Organization and the Pan American Health Organization, and was formerly the Assistant Surgeon General of the United States Public Health Service, as well as the CDC liaison member to the National Vaccine Advisory Committee for over 14 years. He has also co-authored the textbook Vaccines along with Paul Offit and Stanley A. Plotkin. He is currently a professor of infectious diseases at Emory University, a post he was originally appointed to in March 2004 and then held until October 2008, after which he became affiliated with the Bill and Melinda Gates Foundation, where he served as deputy director of immunization programs before returning to Emory in September 2011.

Selected publications

References

External links

City College of New York alumni
Living people
Emory University faculty
Albert Einstein College of Medicine alumni
Vaccinologists
Clinton administration personnel
George W. Bush administration personnel
Year of birth missing (living people)
Members of the National Academy of Medicine